Gastrocopta moravica is a fossil species of very small air-breathing land snail, a terrestrial pulmonate gastropod mollusk in the family Vertiginidae, the whorl snails.

This species is known from the Upper Pliocene to the Early Pleistocene. Gastrocopta moravica (together with Gastrocopta serotina) is chronostratigraphically significant as an index fossil for the Late Tiglian (= Gelasian, within the Early Pleistocene).

Subspecies 
 Gastrocopta moravica oligodonta (Krolopp, 1979) - the shell is less conical than the nominate form. The intraparietal tooth of the aperture is reduced to a thickening at one point.

Distribution 
The type locality of Gastrocopta moravica is a cave near Hlubné near Ochoz u Brna, Moravský Kras, the Czech Republic.

Records of this species include the Czech Republic, Hungary (locality Rábaszentandrás), Germany and France (locality Cessey-sur-Tille).

Krolopp (1979) found Gastrocopta moravica oligodonta together with Gastrocopta serotina in Hungary near Szabádhidvég. Rähle (1995) found Gastrocopta moravica oligodonta in argillaceous high flood deposits in Uhlenberg (Iller-Lech Plate, Bavarian Swabia). Wedel (2008) found Gastrocopta moravica oligodonta in Viernheim research borehole, Germany.

References
This article incorporates CC-BY-3.0 text from the reference

Further reading 
  Kroupa O. (1993). "Zpráva o znovuobjevení holotypu Gastrocopta moravica (Petrbok, 1950)(sic!) (Gastropoda, Vertiginidae). [Report about the re-discovery of Gastrocopta moravica holotype]". Zemní (zemný) plyn a nafta 38(4): 257-259.

Vertiginidae
Pliocene gastropods
Pleistocene gastropods